Ernie Leighton (24 March 1872 – 1 August 1959) was an Australian rules footballer who played with Geelong in the Victorian Football League (VFL).

Notes

External links 

1872 births
1959 deaths
Australian rules footballers from Victoria (Australia)
Geelong Football Club players